Puedo prometer y prometo (Spanish "I can promise, and I do promise...") is a classic catchphrase said by Spanish politician Adolfo Suárez, first said in the first post-Franco general elections in Spain in 1977.

The phrase, which was initially derided by some comedians soon became a definitive accolade for choosing Suárez and is remembered as one of the symbols of the Spanish Transition subsequently being used in popular parlance for both political and journalistic purposes.

Background
Caudillo Francisco Franco died on November 20, 1975. Two days later, Juan Carlos I was proclaimed King of Spain at the Palacio de las Cortes palace in accordance with the provisions of the Spanish law of succession referendum, 1947. The first government under King Juan Carlos I kingdom was headed by Carlos Arias Navarro and failed in the attempt to transform Spain into a democracy, getting overwhelmed by the many demonstrations against it. So, in July 1976, Adolfo Suárez was appointed Prime Minister by the King. Despite not having initially public support, Suárez managed to unite all democratic forces to develop a process of reform that allowed turning the Spanish State into a Western democracy. With that in mind it was enacted the Political Reform Act of 1977, the last of the Fundamental Laws of the Realm which had gone ahead through concessions made by the Government of Suárez and supported by the President of the Cortes Españolas, Torcuato Fernández-Miranda, which had been approved in the Spanish political reform referendum, 1976, the project received the approval of 94.1% of voters.

The Government, in agreement with the provisions of Royal Decree-Law 20/1977 of March 18 called for elections by universal suffrage for a new bicameral Parliament, to be held on June 15, 1977. In turn, they ensured that these elections were fully democratic and counted with the presence of the left through measures such as the legalization of the Communist Party of Spain, the dissolution of the Movimiento Nacional or extension of the amnesty.

Speech
The phrase, designed by Suárez speechwriter (and later his presidential Communication Director) , was part of the discourse of Adolfo Suárez, as candidate of the Union of the Democratic Centre, which was part of the free spaces that electoral political parties arranged to go to citizens in the closing of the election campaign, June 13, 1977. This speech, broadcast by RTVE, was the one that closed the election messages and was introduced by a tune whose lyrics said: "Vote center, vote Suárez, vote freedom. The sure path to democracy". Adolfo Suárez subsequently appeared on screen, uttering his discourse, with a first part relating to the promises fulfilled

Once Suárez had referred to the promises he had kept he used the formula "I can promise, and I promise..." to give strength to his speech

Legacy

The inclusion of the "I can promise and I do promise" formula in the final speech of the election campaign has been considered a posteriori as a key factor in the victory of the Union of the Democratic Centre, since a victory of the Spanish Socialist Workers' Party was also considered possible. Suárez managed to identify UCD with himself (hence the use of the first person in the phrase) providing strength to a party which later (with Suárez's resignation in 1981) proved to be very unstable.

References

External links 
First Spanish electoral elections on TV in 1977 (Cut of «puedo prometer y prometo»)

Political catchphrases
1977 in Spain